Rinodinella is a genus of lichen-forming fungi in the family Physciaceae.

References

Caliciales
Lichen genera
Caliciales genera
Taxa described in 1978
Taxa named by Helmut Mayrhofer
Taxa named by Josef Poelt